Thapelo Mokoena is a South African actor, television producer and presenter. He is best known for his role on UKs Bulletproof S3 as William, Trackers the series and presenting the first season of the South African version of the reality competition Fear Factor in 2005.

Work
He has also played the role of Cedric Fatani in Wild at Heart from 2007 to 2012. He also played Elias Motsoaledi in the 2013 film Mandela: Long Walk to Freedom. He is the owner of his own production company, Easy Sundays Productions. He has starred in quite a few movies and television shows, one of which being Between Friends: Ithala He has played a major role in Nothing for Mahala as well. He also acts on Broken Vows as Uhuru. He played on Mrs Nice Guy in 2016. He play Quinn on the hit series Trackers. He also played William on Sky TV's Bulletproof season 3.

References

Living people
South African male television actors
South African television presenters
1982 births